Parliamentary elections were held in Colombia on March 12, 2006 to elect members of the Senate and Chamber of Representatives. Presidential primaries were also held for the Liberal Party and the Alternative Democratic Pole prior to the upcoming presidential elections in May.

Chamber of Representatives

Senate
In the two-seat indigenous constituency, more blank votes were cast than votes for parties, resulting in a re-run being required. This took place with the same parties (AICO and ASI) but difference candidates.

Senate Members

 Of the 102 elected congressman and women that took office on July 20, 2006. 52 were re-elected, 25 had previously served in the Chamber of Representatives of Colombia in the 2002–2006 term, 3 returned to the senate after a few years of absence and 22 were elected to congress for the first time.

References

See also
Spanish language Wikinews article

Parliamentary elections in Colombia
2006 elections in South America
Legislative
March 2006 events in South America